is a town located in Niwa District, Aichi Prefecture, Japan. , the town had an estimated population of 34,144 in 14,017 households, and a population density of 3,051 persons per km².

Geography
Fusō is located in the extreme northeast corner of Aichi Prefecture, bordering on Gifu Prefecture. The Kiso River and the Gojō River flow through the town.

Neighboring municipalities
Aichi Prefecture
Inuyama 
Kōnan
Ōguchi 
Gifu Prefecture
 Kakamigahara

Demographics
Per Japanese census data, the population of Fuso has been relatively steady over the past 70 years.

Climate
The town has a climate characterized by hot and humid summers, and relatively mild winters (Köppen climate classification Cfa).  The average annual temperature in Agui is 15.5 °C. The average annual rainfall is 1872 mm with September as the wettest month. The temperatures are highest on average in August, at around 28.1 °C, and lowest in January, at around 4.0 °C.

History
The area of Fuso was mostly part of Owari Domain under the Edo period Tokugawa shogunate. After the Meiji restoration, the villages of Yamana and Toyokuni were established within Niwa District, Aichi in 1872 with the establishment of the modern municipalities system.  Fusō Village was established on October 1, 1906 through the merger of Yamana and Toyokuni with a portion of neighboring Takao and Kashiwamori. Fusō was raised to town status on August 1, 1952.

Economy
During the pre-modern period, the area was noted for sericulture and the production of mulberry leaves. Agriculture, notably the growing of daikon radishes, is a mainstay of the local economy.

Education
Fusō has four public elementary schools and two public junior high schools operated by the town government, and one public high school operated by the Aichi Prefectural Board of Education. There is also one private high school.

Transportation

Railway
 Meitetsu – Inuyama Line
  -  -

Highway

References

External links

Fusō official website 

 
Towns in Aichi Prefecture